Imprimi potest or imprimi permittitur (Latin for "it can be printed") is a declaration by a major superior of a Roman Catholic religious institute that writings on questions of religion or morals by a member of the institute may be printed. Superiors make such declarations only after censors charged with examining the writings have granted the nihil obstat, a declaration of no objection. Final approval can then be given through the imprimatur ("let it be printed") of the author's bishop or of the bishop of the place of publication.

See also
 Index Librorum Prohibitorum

References

External links
 Code of Canon Law, The Means of Social Communication and Books in Particular (canons 822-832)

Catholic theology and doctrine
Latin religious words and phrases
Censorship in Christianity
Catholic Church legal terminology
Catholic canon law of religious